Air polymer-type A, sold under the brand name ExEm Foam, is a drug for the detection of fallopian tube patency (openness) in people with known or suspected infertility. It was approved for use in the United States in November 2019.

Air polymer-type A is infused into the uterus to allow for visual assessment of fallopian tubes during an ultrasound examination called a sonohysterosalpingography.

The most common adverse reactions are pelvic pain and abdominal pain, nausea and faintness (caused by a nerve and blood vessel reaction called vasovagal reaction) and post-procedure spotting.

History 
The U.S. Food and Drug Administration (FDA) approved air polymer-type A based on literature reports. To evaluate how well air polymer-type A works, the FDA primarily used data from two trials. Trial A was conducted at a site in Italy and Trial B at three sites in Poland.

Evaluation of side effects was based on multiple literature reports and collected safety reports from countries where air polymer-type A is already approved.

References 

Female genital procedures
Medical ultrasonography
Infertility